Nicola Chiaruzzi (born 25 December 1987) is a Sammarinese footballer who last played for Tre Penne.

He has been capped by the San Marino national football team making his international debut in 2010.

Honours
SP Tre Penne
Campionato Sammarinese: 2011–12, 2012–13, 2015–16, 2018–19
Coppa Titano: 2016–17
San Marino Super Cup: 2013, 2016
Individual
Pallone di Cristallo: 2008

External links

1987 births
Living people
Sammarinese footballers
San Marino international footballers
Association football defenders